The XIII Memorial of Hubert Jerzy Wagner was held at Hala Sportowo-Widowiskowa in Toruń, Poland from 22 to 24 August 2015. Like the previous edition, 4 teams participated in the tournament.

Qualification
All teams except the host must have received an invitation from the organizers.

Squads

Venue

Results
All times are Central European Summer Time (UTC+02:00).

Final standing

Awards

Most Valuable Player
  Michał Kubiak
Best Setter:
  Yoann Jaumel
Best Server:
  Mateusz Bieniek
Best Receiver:
  Yūki Ishikawa
Best Blocker:
  Piotr Nowakowski
Best Spiker:
  Dawid Konarski
Best Libero:
  Paweł Zatorski

References

External links
Official website

Memorial of Hubert Jerzy Wagner
Memorial of Hubert Jerzy Wagner
Memorial of Hubert Jerzy Wagner
Sport in Toruń